is a 2016 Japanese television drama, starring Masaharu Fukuyama and Sakura Fujiwara. It airs on Fuji TV on Mondays at 21:00 (JST) beginning April 11, 2016.

Cast 
 Masaharu Fukuyama as Kohei Kamishiro
 Sakura Fujiwara as Sakura Sano
 Masaki Suda as Soraichi Amano
 Kaho as Mami Nakamura
 Miki Mizuno as Natsuki Shishido
 Ryudo Uzaki as Yuji Sasa
 Tetsushi Tanaka as Taizo Masumura
 Kiyohiko Shibukawa as Kazuo Hoshida
 Sayaka Yamaguchi as Ryoko Watanabe
 Houka Kinoshita as Fumio Takigawa
 Shogo Sakamoto as Masashi Takahashi
 Taro Suruga as Kenta Nomura

Episodes

References

External links
  
 

2016 in Japanese television
Japanese drama television series
2016 Japanese television series debuts
2016 Japanese television series endings
Fuji TV dramas
Japanese romance television series